Joseph Lloyd Dombrowski (born May 12, 1991) is an American professional road racing cyclist who currently rides for UCI WorldTeam .

Personal
Born on May 12, 1991, in Christiana, Delaware, United States, Dombrowski spent his adolescence in Marshall, Virginia, United States. He resides in Marshall, Virginia and Nice, France. Between 2009 and 2010, Dombrowski attended George Mason University in Fairfax, Virginia.

Career

Early years
Dombrowski began mountain biking in 2006, cyclo-cross in 2007 and road racing in 2009, racing for local Virginian team Haymarket Bicycles. During the 2012 season, Dombrowski garnered significant results. He won the Girobio, finished fourth at the Tour of Utah, and placed tenth at the USA Pro Cycling Challenge.

Team Sky (2013–14)
During the 2013 season, Dombrowski assisted British teammate Chris Froome in various multi-day races. During the 2014 season, Dombrowski underwent successful iliac artery surgery.

Cannondale–Garmin (2015–19)
While preparing for the 2015 Vuelta a España, he won the Tour of Utah. In 2019 he won another stage in the Tour of Utah and turned in his best performance in a Grand Tour coming in 12th place overall in the Giro d'Italia.

UAE Team Emirates (2020–21)
During the COVID-19 pandemic-affected 2020 season, Dombrowski's best general classification result was 26th at the Settimana Internazionale di Coppi e Bartali, while he finished 43rd at the Giro d'Italia.

At the 2021 Giro d'Italia, Dombrowski was part of a 25-rider breakaway on a rain-soaked fourth stage; he went clear of the field on the final climb, and soloed to a 13-second victory over Alessandro De Marchi. His first victory in Europe since winning the 2012 Girobio, Dombrowski moved up to second overall in the general classification – trailing De Marchi by 22 seconds – and assumed the blue jersey of mountains classification leader. The following day, Dombrowski crashed into a race marshal manning a traffic island in the last  of the stage to Cattolica. He remounted and finished the stage some eight minutes down, but abandoned the race the following morning with concussion. At the Vuelta a España later in the season, Dombrowski again featured in a first-week breakaway, this time on the third stage to a summit finish at Picón Blanco in the Province of Burgos.

Astana Qazaqstan Team

Major results

2011
 2nd Overall Giro della Valle d'Aosta
1st  Young rider classification
1st Stage 5
 3rd Overall Ronde de l'Isard
 6th Overall Tour of the Gila
 8th Overall Flèche du Sud
2012
 1st  Overall Girobio
1st Young rider classification
1st Stages 4 & 8
 3rd Overall Tour of the Gila
1st  Young rider classification
 4th Overall Tour of Utah
1st  Young rider classification
 10th Overall USA Pro Cycling Challenge
1st  Young rider classification
 10th Overall Cascade Cycling Classic
 10th Trofeo Alcide Degasperi
2013
 1st Stage 1b (TTT) Giro del Trentino
 6th Japan Cup
2015
 1st  Overall Tour of Utah
1st Stage 6
 2nd Road race, National Road Championships
 4th Overall Tour of California
 7th Overall Tour de San Luis
2016
 8th Overall Tour of Utah
2018
 5th Overall Colorado Classic
 6th Overall Tour of Utah
2019
 3rd Overall Tour of Utah
1st Stage 6
 7th Overall Route d'Occitanie
2021 
 Giro d'Italia
1st Stage 4 
Held  after Stages 4–5

Grand Tour general classification results timeline

References

External links

Cannondale–Drapac: Joe Dombrowski 

American male cyclists
People from Marshall, Virginia
1991 births
Living people
People from New Castle County, Delaware
American Giro d'Italia stage winners
Cyclists from Delaware